Akonir Namghar is an organisation to develop interest in young minds about "Eka Sarana Hari Naam Dharma", propagated by Mahapurush Srimanta Sankaradev and Sri Sri Madhavdev, a great Vaishnavite Saint of India. Smti. Arati Das founded on 23 January 2004.

The organisations mission is to spread the message of Gurujana among children. There is Sattriya Sangeet Vidyalaya (affiliated to Asom Satra Mahasabha) run by Guru Govinda Mahanta. People can learn Khol, Taal Sattriya Nritya, Borgeet etc.

References

External links
 Website of Akonir Namghar

Ekasarana Dharma
Hindu organisations based in India
Youth religious organizations
Vaishnavism
Religious organizations established in 2004
Organisations based in Assam
Child-related organisations in India
2004 establishments in Assam